Juan Carlo Calma (born 22 May 1981) is a Filipino visual artist and architect. He lives and works in Makati, Manila, Philippines. He has been called "one of the Philippines’ bright young stars in architecture, interior design, and visual arts."
  
With a degree from a line of artisans and architects, he finished multi-disciplinary courses in sculpture, painting, and light design at the California College of the Arts in San Francisco (2000–2003). He then moved to London and graduated from the Architectural Association School of Architecture (2009).

His works seek to blur the lines between art and architecture. His design practice, Carlo Calma Consultancy, Inc., challenges itself to cross scales and media from bespoke private homes to public installations that have been called "young, edgy, and very impressive."

Aside from private practice, he is currently an architectural design consultant at Multi Development and Construction Corporation, where he has produced architectural works and interiors admired by members of the Philippine elite.

As a visual artist, Calma's work has been exhibited in San Francisco, London, and Manila. He has since taken part in both solo and group exhibitions and been recognized by art collectors in Southeast Asia and beyond. Calma also owns and curates the Manifesto Gallerie in Manila, as well as a fine-dining restaurant that fuses food and art called Gallery Vask.

Important works in architecture and interiors

2015 Bolean House
2015 Envelope House
2015 Brutalist House 
2019 Infinity House
2014 VASK
2014 Mesa 
2011 The Constellation, Diamond Hotel
2011 MI+CASA
2008 The Aranaz Boutique, shortlisted in the Best Retail Interior Awards 2008 in London.

Solo and group exhibitions

2014 Obsession + Fetishes by Carlo Calma, Manifesto Gallerie, Philippines
2014 Carlo Calma: Golden Horse Perforations, Makati Shangrila Lobby, Makati, Philippines
2013 Greenstallations, Nuvali, Laguna, Philippines
2011 Grammar of Movement, Ayala Museum, Makati, Philippines

Public installations

2014 Carlo Calma: Solaire 2, Manufactured Landscapes 3, Solaire, Manila, Philippines
2014 Topography, Magnum Art Installations, SM Aura, Manila, Philippines
2013 Carlo Calma: Green Installations, Public Garden Art in Nuvali, Philippines
2013 Carlo Calma: Get Sassooned Installations, pop-up installation by Mega Group Inc, Philippines
2012 Carlo Calma: Cabinet Curiosities 1&2, Manila Art, Vask Gallery, Manila, Philippines
2012 Carlo Calma: Manufactured Landscapes 1, ManilaArt (art fair), Philippines
2011 Carlo Calma: Manufactured Landscapes 0, NOW Gallery, Manila, Philippines
2009 Grammar of Movement Series, Ayala Museum, Makati, Philippines
2009 Self Help City Masterplan, Urban Farm, AA Exhibit, London, UK
2008 SESC Paraisopolis, Sustainable Environments, AA Exhibit, London, UK
2007 Sweat Colonies, AA Exhibit, London, UK 
2006 Pimp my Ride, Movement in Architecture, AA Exhibit, London, UK
2005 Novelist Solutions, Monster Architecture AA Exhibit, London, UK 
2001 Eculer Series, Posh Salon and Gallery, Fillmore St, San Francisco, California, USA

References

Sources
Enriquez, Marge C. "Flying umbrellas, quirky chairs, teddy bears–it’s a lounge, folks" The Philippine Daily Inquirer, 30 October 2013. 
Enriquez, Marge C. "Sexy but corporate—young architect redefines hotel power floor", The Philippine Daily Inquirer, 3 November 2010.
Jalbuena, Samito. "‘Obsession and Fetishes’", BusinessMirror, 29 November 2014.
Vergara, Alex. "Carlo Calma’s bold, quirky ‘conversations’–between two houses", The Philippine Daily Inquirer, 18 July 2012.

External links
Official website
Multi Development and Construction Corporation
Gallery Vask

1981 births
Living people
People from Makati
Artists from Metro Manila
California College of the Arts alumni
Alumni of the Architectural Association School of Architecture
21st-century Filipino architects